Thomas, Tom or Tommy McDonald may refer to:

Sports
Tom McDonald (footballer, born 1887) (1887-1947), English footballer for Bury
Tommy McDonald (footballer, born 1895) (1895–1969), Scottish football forward for Rangers, Newcastle United and York City also known as Tom
Tommy McDonald (footballer, born 1930) (1930–2004), Scottish footballer of the 1950s and 1960s
Tommy McDonald (American football) (1934–2018), American football player
Tom McDonald (soccer) (born 1959), American soccer player
Tom McDonald (Australian footballer) (born 1992), Australian rules footballer for Melbourne Football Club

Politics
Thomas McDonald, Jr. (1865–?), American politician
Thomas William McDonald (1869–1968), New Zealand politician
Thomas J. McDonald (1883-1931), American reporter and politician from New York
Thomas Pringle McDonald (1901–1969), Scottish lawyer and politician
Thomas McDonald (Australian politician) (1915–1992), member of the Tasmania House of Assembly
Tom McDonald (politician) (born 1946), member of the Missouri House of Representatives
Tom McDonald (diplomat) (born 1953), former U.S. Ambassador to Zimbabwe

Others
Tom McDonald (winemaker) (1907–1987), New Zealand wine-maker
Thomas Buddy McDonald (1922–2008), American child actor

See also
Andrew Thomas McDonald
Thomas MacDonald (disambiguation)